The 1960 United States presidential election in Connecticut took place on November 8, 1960, as part of the 1960 United States presidential election, which was held throughout all 50 states. Voters chose eight representatives, or electors to the Electoral College, who voted for president and vice president.

Connecticut voted for the Democratic nominee, Senator John F. Kennedy of Massachusetts, over the Republican nominee, Vice President Richard Nixon of California. Kennedy ran with Senate Majority Leader Lyndon B. Johnson of Texas, while Nixon's running mate was Ambassador Henry Cabot Lodge, Jr. of Massachusetts.

Kennedy carried Connecticut by a comfortable margin of 7.47%, making him the first Democratic winner in the state since Franklin D. Roosevelt in 1944.

As of the 2020 presidential election, this marks the last time in which the town of Mansfield was carried by the Republican nominee, as well as the last time in which Connecticut voted for a different candidate than Maine. This is also the most recent occasion that Connecticut voted more Democratic than neighboring New York.

Results

By county

See also
 United States presidential elections in Connecticut

References

Connecticut
1960
1960 Connecticut elections